Batocera rufomaculata is a species of beetle in the family Cerambycidae. It was described by Charles De Geer in 1775. It is known from China, Israel, India, Jordan, Lebanon, Laos, Mauritius, Malaysia, Madagascar, Myanmar, Puerto Rico, Pakistan, Réunion, Syria, Sri Lanka, Thailand, Barbados, Bangladesh and the Virgin Islands. It feeds off of Ficus carica, Carica papaya, Mangifera indica, and Shorea robusta. It can be parasitically infected by Avetianella batocerae.

References

Batocerini
Beetles described in 1775
Taxa named by Charles De Geer
Beetles of Africa
Beetles of Asia